Zerboni is a surname. Notable people with the surname include:

McCall Zerboni (born 1986), American soccer player
Salvador Zerboni (born 1979), Mexican actor

See also
Joseph Zerboni di Sposetti (1760–1831), German philosopher